Nyifon (Iordaa) is a poorly known Jukunoid language of Buruku LGA, Benue State, Nigeria. There may have been about 1,000 speakers in the 1990s. The language is not reported in Ethnologue. Glottolog lists it as a dialect of Wapan language.

References

Jukunoid languages
Languages of Nigeria